Alan Michael Goad (born 8 August 1948) is a retired English footballer and coach who played as a defender for Exeter City, Hartlepool United and Vancouver Whitecaps. He is fifth in Hartlepool’s all time appearance holders list.

Playing career
Goad started his playing career with Exeter City in 1965. He spent two seasons with The Grecians playing six times.  

In 1967, Goad signed for Hartlepool United. Goad won the club’s Player of the Year award in 1975. In October 1976, he took up a player/coach role with Hartlepool. For his years of service to the club, Goad was awarded with a testimonial match in 1977 against Nottingham Forest who were managed by his former Hartlepool manager Brian Clough. Clough brought a full-strength side to Victoria Park and drew 2-2. Goad left Hartlepool in 1978, during his time with the club he made 418 appearances scoring eleven times.

In 1980, Goad moved to Canada and played for Vancouver Whitecaps. He also played for their indoor team. After finishing playing, Goad began coaching the Whitecaps youth team.

Personal life
While playing for Hartlepool, Goad ran two pubs in Spennymoor. Goad still lives in British Columbia and since retiring from football coaching, he spends his days travelling with his wife Sue.

References

External links
Player profile
Alan Goad's player profile at In The Mad Crowd
Alan Goad's player profile at Barry Hugman's Footballers
Vancouver Whitecaps player profile

1948 births
Living people
People from Hailsham
English footballers
Association football defenders
Exeter City F.C. players
Hartlepool United F.C. players
Vancouver Whitecaps (1974–1984) players
English Football League players
North American Soccer League (1968–1984) players
Expatriate soccer players in Canada
Hartlepool United F.C. non-playing staff
British publicans